Grain From Ukraine is a humanitarian food program that was launched on November 26, 2022, on the 90th anniversary of the beginning of the Holodomor of 1932-1933, by the President of Ukraine, Volodymyr Zelenskyy, to supply grain to the poorest countries in Africa. The program aims to provide grain to at least 5 million people by the end of spring 2023.

History

Prior to 2022, Ukraine was one of the key World Food Programme grain suppliers and the world's 4th largest grain exporter. The blockade of Ukrainian ports by the Black Sea Fleet in the first weeks of the full-scale invasion interrupted grain exports, rapidly increasing global food prices and fueling food crises, greatly increasing the risk of famine in the poorest countries.

Grain exports from Ukraine were resumed within the Black Sea Grain Initiative in July and August 2022. From August to November 2022, over 11 billion tons of supplies went to 38 countries, and WFP and USAID resumed humanitarian shipments to the poorest countries.

The Grain from Ukraine program was proposed by the president Vladimir Zelensky at the 2022 G20 Bali summit as a way to support humanitarian shipments to the countries in need and Ukrainian grain producers. The initiative was officially launmched on November 26, 2022, at the food security summit in Kyiv on the 90th anniversary of Holodomor.

Ukrainian authorities emphasized that the Grain from Ukraine program aims to highlight the role of Ukraine as a responsible member of the global community, and to challenge the Russian propaganda which put the blame for the food crises on the Ukraine and its Western partners.

Format 

The goal of the Grain from Ukraine program is to prevent famine and provide food to no less than 5 million people in the poorest countries of Africa and Asia, such as Ethiopia, Sudan, Southern Sudan, Somalia, Yemen, Kongo, Kenya, and Nigeria. Ukrainian authorities schduled around 60 shipments, each providing food to up to 90 thousand people. Donor countries purchase the grain from a separate pool, accumulating harvest from small and medium-sized farms. The freight costs are covered by the Grain from Ukraine program participants.

Participants 

By the end of 2022, donations to Grain from Ukraine totaled up to USD 200 million from 30 countries.

 Ukraine purchased 50 thousand tons of grain for the first two ships (around 420 million hrivnas); Germany and Japan paid for the freight. 
 The European Commission donated funds to purchase 40 thousand tons of grain. This came in addition to EUR 1 billion provided within the Solidarity Laanes food export program.
 USAID provided USD 20 million in addition to USD 173 million donated to WFP to purchase grain within the Black Sea Grain Initiative. and over USD 11 billion in humanitarian aid provided to the poorest countries in 2022.
 South Korea donated USD 3 million via the WFP.
 Sweden donated SEK 100 million (USD 9,5 million) in addition to SEK 400 million provided to SEK 400 million provided earlier to WFP.
 Other donors included Austria (USD 3,9 million), the UK (USD 6 million), Canada (USD 30 million), Netherlands (USD 4 million)., France (USD 20 million), as well as Germany, Qatar, Norway, Poland, Turkiye, and Japan.

Outcomes 

In November and December 2022, the first shipments were complete to Ethiopia and Somalia, and several more ships were on the way.

See also
Food security

References

Grain and the 2022 Russian invasion of Ukraine
Charities based in Ukraine
Brands
2022 establishments in Ukraine